Paul Annacone and Doug Flach were the defending champions, but did not participate this year.

Tommy Ho and Kent Kinnear won the title, defeating David Adams and Andrei Olhovskiy 7–6, 6–3 in the final.

Seeds

  David Adams /  Andrei Olhovskiy (final)
  Henrik Holm /  Anders Järryd (quarterfinals)
  Jim Grabb /  Alex O'Brien (semifinals)
  Rick Leach /  Brett Steven (semifinals)

Draw

Draw

External links
Draw

1994 ATP Tour